Leah was the first wife of the Biblical patriarch Jacob.

Leah may also refer to:

Places
Leah, Iran, a village in Gilan Province, Iran
Leah Peak, Alberta, Canada
Leah Lake, Idaho, United States
Leah Ridge, Antarctica

People with the name
Leah (given name)
Anna Leah, English-born New Zealand pop singer in the 1970s
John Leah (born 1978), English footballer
Sandy Leah (born 1983), Brazilian singer, songwriter, producer, and actress
Vince Leah (1913–1993), Canadian journalist, writer and sports administrator

Arts and entertainment

Fictional entities
Leah (The Walking Dead), a fictional character from the television series The Walking Dead
Leah, one of the main characters in Shimmer and Shine
Leah, New Hampshire, a fictional town created by Thomas Williams (writer) and depicted in Leah, New Hampshire: Collected Stories Of Thomas Williams
Queen Leah, fictional character in the Sleeping Beauty
Leah, a non-playable character in Diablo III

Music
Leah (album), only album released by Leah Hayward
"Leah," a 1962 Roy Orbison song
"Leah", a song by Bruce Springsteen from Devils & Dust

Other uses in arts and entertainment
Leah (sculpture), a sculpture by Michelangelo

Other uses
Leah, an 8" refractor telescope at the Chabot Space and Science Center

See also
Lea (disambiguation)
Lee (disambiguation)
Leia
Leigh (disambiguation)
Lia